Hermaea coirala is a species of sacoglossan sea slug, a shell-less marine opisthobranch gastropod mollusk in the family Hermaeidae.

References

Hermaeidae
Gastropods described in 1955